Lancaster City Historic District is a national historic district located at Lancaster and Manheim Township, Lancaster County, Pennsylvania. It measures 3 square miles and includes 13,459 contributing buildings, 9 contributing sites, 6 contributing structures, and 19 contributing objects in the city of Lancaster.  The buildings date from 1760 to 1950, with the majority dating from 1860 to 1930. A number of buildings were designed by Lancaster architect C. Emlen Urban. All the previously listed individual buildings and structures and historic districts are included in this district.  Other notable buildings and sites include the City Hall (1891-1892), Lancaster County Prison (1851), Miller and Hartman Building, Shaub Shoe Store, Watt & Shand, Conestoga Steam Cotton Works (1845-1910), Posey Iron Works, St. Mary's Catholic Church (1852 / 1867), Temple Shaarai Shamoyim (1895-1896), Bethel A.M.E. Church (c. 1880), the Unitarian Universalist Church of Lancaster, Pennsylvania Railroad Station (1929), Lancaster Cemetery, Woodward Hill Cemetery, and Zion Lutheran Cemetery.

It was listed on the National Register of Historic Places in 2001.

References

Historic districts on the National Register of Historic Places in Pennsylvania
Buildings and structures in Lancaster, Pennsylvania
Tourist attractions in Lancaster, Pennsylvania
Historic districts in Lancaster County, Pennsylvania
National Register of Historic Places in Lancaster, Pennsylvania